The Minister of Foreign Affairs is a senior member of the New Zealand Government heading the Ministry of Foreign Affairs and Trade and responsible for relations with foreign countries.

The current Minister of Foreign Affairs is Nanaia Mahuta.

Responsibilities and powers
The Minister of Foreign Affairs is responsible for overseeing New Zealand's relations with foreign countries and the promotion of New Zealand's interests abroad. The Minister is in charge of the Ministry of Foreign Affairs and Trade, including New Zealand's diplomatic staff. The office is often considered to be one of the more distinguished ministerial posts, and has at times been counted as the most senior role below that of the Prime Minister. In terms of actual political power, however, the Minister of Foreign Affairs is not as prominent as in countries such as Australia, Canada, the United Kingdom and the United States, with the Minister of Finance being considerably more influential.

Historically, the Minister of Foreign Affairs has been a member of Cabinet, with the exception of the Rt Hon. Winston Peters between 2005 and 2008. This situation came about as the result of coalition negotiations in which it was agreed that New Zealand First would take a senior ministerial portfolio but would not join Cabinet.

History
The first New Zealand foreign minister was James Allen, appointed to the post of "Minister of External Affairs" by William Massey in 1919. Before this time, there was no dedicated ministerial portfolio for foreign relations. A Department of External Affairs was created in 1919 but its functions were limited to administering New Zealand's Island Territories in the Pacific; namely the Cook Islands, Niue, Tokelau, and the League of Nations Mandate of Samoa. In 1943, a new Department of External Affairs was created to conduct the country's external relations. The older department was then renamed the Department of Island Territories and a separate portfolio called the Minister of Island Territories was subsequently created.

From 1943, the Minister of External Affairs became the main ministerial portfolio for conducting New Zealand's external relations.  Like its similarly named Australian and Canadian counterparts, the portfolio was called "External Affairs" rather than "Foreign Affairs" in deference of  the British Government's responsibility for conducting foreign policy on behalf of the British Empire and later the Commonwealth of Nations. The title was changed to "Minister of Foreign Affairs" in 1970 after the Department was renamed the Ministry of Foreign Affairs. The title became "Minister of Foreign Affairs and Trade" following the abandonment of the short-lived "Minister of External Relations and Trade" title, created in September 1988 when the Ministry of Foreign Affairs absorbed the Trade functions of the old Department of Trade and Industry. In 2005 responsibility for trade was split into a separate portfolio, with the title reverting to "Minister of Foreign Affairs".

Historically it has been common for Prime Ministers to take on the role of Foreign Minister themselves, particularly if they have an interest in the field. Several New Zealand Prime Ministers including Peter Fraser, Walter Nash, Keith Holyoake, and David Lange held the External Affairs portfolio. The most recent Prime Minister to do this is Helen Clark in 2008 as Acting Minister, and prior to her was Mike Moore, in 1990. Thirteen Prime Ministers have served as Foreign Minister for all or part of their terms.

New Zealand has had 28 foreign ministers (regardless of exact title). The longest-serving was Keith Holyoake, who held the post for the duration of his 11-year premiership. The second longest-serving, and the longest-serving who was not also Prime Minister, was Don McKinnon, who later became Commonwealth Secretary-General.

List of ministers of foreign affairs
Key

References

External links
New Zealand Ministry of Foreign Affairs and Trade

Foreign Affairs
Foreign relations of New Zealand